"Moonflight" is a song written and originally recorded by Vik Venus (Alias: Your Main Moon Man) in 1969. It is a 'break-in' song, with popular hits of the day interspersed at humorous points throughout the song in response to spoken-word prompts, in the style of Dickie Goodman, who had many such hits. 
"Moonflight" became a hit during the summer of '69, reaching #38 U.S. Billboard and #23 Cash Box.  It also charted in Canada, where it reached #20.  It did best in South Africa, however, where it reached #7.

The song was Venus' only hit record. However, a follow-up song, also moon-landing themed, was released entitled "Moonjack."  The featured 'break-in' songs, however, were sampled in the style of Alvin & the Chipmunks.

Dickie Goodman also did a moon-landing themed song entitled "Luna Trip."

Chart history

Songs 
The songs sampled (in order) are:

 "Simon Says" by 1910 Fruitgum Company
 "Goody Goody Gumdrops" by 1910 Fruitgum Company
 "Quick Joey Small (Run Joey Run)" by Kasenetz-Katz Singing Orchestral Circus
 "Jelly Jungle (of Orange Marmalade)" by Lemon Pipers
 "I'm a Fool for You" by The Impressions
 "Green Tambourine" by Lemon Pipers
 "Chewy Chewy" by Ohio Express
 "Indian Giver" by 1910 Fruitgum Company
 "Yummy, Yummy, Yummy" by Ohio Express
 "Rice Is Nice" by Lemon Pipers
 "Baby Make Me Feel So Good" by The Five Stairsteps
 "Chewy Chewy" by Ohio Express
 "Quick Joey Small (Run Joey Run)" by Kasenetz-Katz Singing Orchestral Circus
 "Goody Goody Gumdrops" by 1910 Fruitgum Company
 "Special Delivery" by 1910 Fruitgum Company
 "This Is My Country" by The Impressions
 "Blessed Is the Rain" by Brooklyn Bridge
 "Welcome Me Love" by Brooklyn Bridge
 "1, 2, 3, Red Light" by 1910 Fruitgum Company
 "The Worst That Could Happen" by Brooklyn Bridge
 "Mercy" by Ohio Express

References

External links
Lyrics of this song
 

1969 songs
1969 singles
Buddah Records singles
American songs
Novelty songs
Songs about spaceflight
Songs about the Moon